Ryler DeHeart (born March 1, 1984 in Kauai, Hawaii) is an American former professional tennis player. He reached his singles career high ranking of 174 on May 3, 2010. He was coached by Brad Dancer. DeHeart resides in Champaign, Illinois.

Professional career
His first win on the ATP Tour came as a qualifier at the 2008 US Open where he beat Olivier Rochus in five sets. He lost to Rafael Nadal in the next round, 1–6, 2–6, 4–6, despite taking a 3–0 lead in the third set. He predominantly played Challenger tournaments.

On June 7, 2009, he won his first title on the ATP Challenger Tour, with a 6–2, 3–6, 7–5 victory over Carsten Ball in the final of the Yuba City Challenger in California.

Career titles

Singles (3)

Doubles (2)

Collegiate career
DeHeart played college tennis at the University of Illinois at Urbana-Champaign, where he achieved a number one in the ITA singles rankings and was a two-time All-American. As a junior, he won the ITA National Intercollegiate Indoor Singles Championship. As a senior, he was a semifinalist at the ITA All-American Championships and won the consolation title at the ITA National Indoor Championships. He finished his career with a singles record of 138–36 (most wins in Illinois history) and a doubles record of 104–38.

References

External links
 
 
 DeHeart College Profile
 Official Fan Site

1984 births
Living people
American male tennis players
Illinois Fighting Illini men's tennis players
Sportspeople from Champaign, Illinois
People from Kauai County, Hawaii
Tennis people from Hawaii
Tennis people from Illinois